Léonce Cargue (20 October 1880 – 14 January 1955) was a French stage and film actor.

Selected filmography
 Prince Jean (1928)
 The Maelstrom of Paris (1928)
 Saint Joan the Maid (1929)

References

Bibliography
 Waldman, Harry. Maurice Tourneur: The Life and Films. McFarland, 2001.

External links

1880 births
1955 deaths
French male film actors
French male silent film actors
20th-century French male actors
French male stage actors
Male actors from Paris